Rukungiri District is a district in the Western Region of Uganda. The town of Rukungiri is the site of the district headquarters.

Location
The district is bordered by Lake Edward to the North West, Rubirizi District to the northeast, Mitooma District to the northeast and east, Ntungamo District to the east and southeast, Rukiga District and Rubanda District to the south, Kanungu District to the west, and the Democratic Republic of the Congo via Lake Edward to the northwest.

Prominent people
The district is the birthplace of the current President of Uganda Yoweri Museveni.

The district is the birthplace of Kizza Besigye, who was a candidate for the Ugandan presidency in 2001, 2006,2011 and 2016.

Other prominent Ugandans who hail from the district include 

Philemon Kitaburaza Karegyesa (deceased) former Secretary General of Kigezi

Hon. Kham Karekaho Karegyesa (deceased) former Minister in Obote 2 Gov't and son of Omukama Karegyesa, king of Rujumbura, Mpororo

Mr. Mathew Rukikaire Founding member of Uganda Patriotic Movement now National Resistance Movement

Gen. Aronda Nyakairima (deceased), the former minister of internal affairs and former Chief of Defence Forces of the UPDF

Maj.Gen. Jim Muhwezi Minister of Security, Member of Parliament representing Rujumbura and former Minister of Education and Sports, former Minister of Health and former ISO Director General also serving as the head of NRM Veterans in the CEC

Allen Kagina former URA Executive Director 

Bwengye Duncan, founder and CEO Octien Technologies a high tech E-mobility startup.

Mugasho Lincoln, the most sought after cyber security expert in the country.

Morrison Rwakakamba, Ugandan public administrator and economist

Lt. Gen. Henry Tumukunde, the former Updf Chief of planning, Updf chief of personnel and administration, Updf Commander of 4th division, director of ISO, director of CMI, MP of Rubaabo, Minister of Security and Presidential Candidate in 2021.

The parliamentary representatives of this district are Mary Paula Kebirungi Turyahikayo (NRM) for Rubabo, Jim Muhwezi(NRM) for Rujumbura, Betty Muzanira (FDC) woman representative and Ronald Kaginda (FDC) Rukungiri Municipality.

Population
In 1991, the population of the district was estimated at 230,100. The 2002 national census estimated the population at 275,200. The district annual population growth rate was calculated at 1.6 percent. In 2012, the population was estimated at 321,300.

Economic activities

Employment in urban centers is scarce, with many qualified candidates clamoring for the few available positions.

The economy of Rukungiri of the trade, industry, agriculture, and human resources.  Africa is a resource-rich continent. Recent growth has been due to growth in sales in commodities, services, and manufacturing. Rukungiri District is largely depended on agriculture(subsistence farming). Trade is the main economic activity in Rukungiri town below are some of the popular businesses in Rukungiri.

Sonko Electronics, Bwoma Tea & Coffee factory, Lorycon Hotel, Okapi Hotel, Gesso Inn

Other points of interest
The following points of interest are in Rukungiri District:

 Kisizi Hospital - A 250-bed private hospital administered by the Church of Uganda
 Karoli Lwanga Hospital, Nyakibale- A 200-bed hospital administered by the Uganda Catholic Church
 Immaculate Heart Girls' School-Nyakibale, one of the top academic giant Schools in the country

See also
 Kigezi
 Districts of Uganda

References

External links
 Community Involvement in Obstetric Emergency Management in Rural Areas: A Case of Rukungiri District, Western Uganda

 
Districts of Uganda
Kigezi sub-region
Western Region, Uganda